Carl-Ludwig Wagner (9 January 1930 – 27 July 2012) was a German politician of the Christian Democratic Union.

Wagner was born in Düsseldorf, but later lived in Eitelsbach, a part of Trier.  After his Abitur 1949 in Trier he studied law at the University of Mainz and one year in Montpellier. He got his doctorate in 1961.

Wagner was the 5th Minister President of Rhineland-Palatinate from 1988 to 1991, Minister from 1979 to 1988 (law, finances), a member of the Bundestag (1969–1976) and worked for the European Parliament in Luxembourg from 1959 to 1969.

References

External links 
 

1930 births
2012 deaths
Johannes Gutenberg University Mainz alumni
University of Montpellier alumni
Members of the Landtag of Rhineland-Palatinate
People from the Rhine Province
Politicians from Düsseldorf
Ministers-President of Rhineland Palatinate
Grand Crosses with Star and Sash of the Order of Merit of the Federal Republic of Germany
Members of the Bundestag for Rhineland-Palatinate
Members of the Bundestag 1972–1976
Members of the Bundestag 1969–1972
Members of the Bundestag for the Christian Democratic Union of Germany